"What?" is a song recorded by Filipino boy band SB19 as the first single off their extended play Pagsibol. The song was written by the band leader Pablo, who also produced the song, together with his brother Joshua Daniel Nase, Simon Servida, and South Border's Jay Oliver Durias. It was released on March 9, 2021, by Sony Music in conjunction with the premiere of its official music video which was directed by the band member Justin.

Background and composition 
The song was written, composed, and produced by the leader of SB19, Pablo (credited as John Paulo Nase). His brother, Joshua Daniel Nase, along with the member of South Border Jay Durias and Filipino-Canadian producer Simon Servida also co-produced the track. It is an incorporation of dance and electro-pop with elements of rap, rock, hip-hop, and EDM. The song was composed in the key A major on the original mix while in G♭ minor on the extended version with a tempo of 96 beats per minute. Servida mentioned in a vlog showing the song's production, that "What?" was quite a challenge due to the tempo changes and complexity which Pablo asked for a heavier and more explosive beat. It is a take-off from SB19's debut album which is dominated by dance-pop and ballad style and is "really different" from what they have done before. Pablo stated that the song has a more "aggressive take to it" than their previous songs and added that it is an anthem about self-love and empowerment. However, others noticed that the song contains few lyrics with political references.

Release and promotion 
"What?" was revealed to the public as SB19's newest single on February 25, 2021, via YouTube and on their other social media accounts. SB19 revealed several photos and teaser clips showing few scenes of the music video, photos, and choreography before its official release on March 9. However, on March 8, 2021, ShowBT Philippines, the talent agency that holds SB19, announced the temporary postponement of the virtual music launch that was scheduled the following day after the release due to the members being exposed to an individual who tested positive for COVID-19; the boy band is placed into quarantine. The company apologized on their official statement posted on SB19's official social media and said the music launch will have a new event date announced soon. Despite the postponement, the digital single along with its official merchandise and music video has still pushed through as scheduled.

On April 24, 2021, the limited edition premium fashion merch in collaboration with designer Chynna Mamawal was released. The collection featured streetwear fits limited only to 100 pieces that come in two sets, as well as shirts and dresses inspired by the single. A month after, a five-episode documentary entitled What?: The Making Film was uploaded on their YouTube channel every week, which featured the behind-the-scenes footage of the preparation of "What?".

Critical reception 
Apple Music reviewed "What?" as a "patriotic OPM pop that hits hard enough to start a street party." Max San Diego from uDou described the song as the same to the composition of Girl's Generation's "I Got A Boy", both with multiple beat changes and genres; added that "What?" is "messily laid out but you can still agree that it works" and a "hallmark song" for all music in P-pop. Rank The Mag called it a "contagiously massive sound that’s larger and louder than life", while LionHearTV defined the song with its "breezy upbeat vibe" dominated with "catchphrase-driven identity". Bulatlat said "What?" is an incorporation of different styles, tempos, and meanings "wrapped in metaphors and imagery that could initially confuse a listener but all working beautifully in the end".

Music video 

The music video was directed by the band's sub-vocalist Justin, which was released on the same release date as the official audio on March 9, 2021. Justin was involved mostly on this side of the band's music production as manifested in their previous music video "Hanggang sa Huli". In the video, the members "showcased their singing and dancing skills while rocking various outfits" designed for the concept. The music video earned 1.4 million views a day after its premiere. Media outlets described the setting in the video as "fictional" and a "post-apocalyptic world" with "chaos and energy" placed to it. Some shared that the video's editing and visual effects could go for another review, yet it still "set the bar way too high" for the quality of Filipino pop music videos.

At the end of the video, the Murillo-Vellarde map was featured, which is a historical object that was previously used to strengthen the Philippines’ claim over the West Philippine Sea. The appearance of the map stirred conversation on Reddit in which a user pointed out that "no evidence or proof can be used if the national government itself does not support it". Other users also commended the group's efforts in elevating consciousness on the importance of the map.

Live performances 
SB19 performed "What?" on their virtual fan meet sponsored by TikTok Philippines on April 17, 2021, with vocals only due to venue restrictions. Two weeks after, they performed the song on national television for the first time at the morning show Unang Hirit. On May 9, they headlined the mother's day special episode of Sunday noontime show All-Out Sundays with "What?" live. On May 15, SB19 did a performance of the song on variety show ASAP. The song was performed on the live broadcast of "Mapa" music showcase three days after. It was also performed at Lazada 6.6 Super Show on June 5, 2021.

Track listing 
Digital
"What?"4:30
"What?" (Extended Version)5:19

Credits and personnel 
Credits adapted from Tidal and music video.

 John Paulo Nase – primary vocals, composer, producer
Justin De Dios – primary vocals
Felip Jhon Suson – primary vocals
Stellvester Ajero – primary vocals, choreography
Josh Cullen Santos – primary vocals
 Joshua Daniel Nase – producer
 Jay Durias – producer
 Simon Servida – producer
 Leon Zervos – mastering engineer
 Janno Queyquep – guitar
 Hyun Jeong Ko – mixing engineer
Louis Anthony Duran – cover art design
Tank Bautista – choreography

Accolades

References 

2021 singles
2021 songs
SB19 songs
Tagalog-language songs
Sony Music singles